This is a list of Memphis Tigers football players in the NFL Draft.

Key

Selections 
As of 2022, the Memphis football program has produced 136 NFL & AFL Draft picks.  An additional 41 Memphis players have gone on to be signed by teams as undrafted free agents.  In 2020, Isaac Bruce became the first Memphis player inducted in to the Pro Football Hall of Fame. The Pro Football Hall of Fame currently ranks former Tiger Stephen Gostkowski as the sixth-best kicker in NFL history. Other notable former Memphis players include Andy Nelson, Dick Hudson, Harry Schuh, Tim Harris, DeAngelo Williams, and Dontari Poe.

Since 2019, the Memphis program has become known for producing a number of successful NFL running backs, including four drafted from 2019 to 2021 and a fifth signed as a free agent in 2020. In September 2021, sportscaster Dan Patrick dubbed Memphis the new "Running Back U".

currently active players are in bold

Undrafted Free Agents

References

Memphis

Memphis Tigers NFL Draft